Thomas or Tom Peters may refer to:

 Thomas Peters (revolutionary) (1738–1792), one of the leaders of the African Americans brought to Nova Scotia after the American Revolutionary War
 Thomas Peters (1745–1857), Dutchman and earliest verifiable supercentenarian
 Thomas Peters (born 1958), civil name of the German musician Tommi Stumpff
 Thomas Minott Peters (1810–1888), American lawyer, Alabama Chief Justice, and botanist
 Thomas Kimmwood Peters (1879–1973), American motion picture producer, newsreel cameraman, photographer, educator, and inventor
 Tom Peters (born 1942), American writer on business management practices
 Tom Peters (footballer) (1920–2010), English footballer
 Tom Peters (rugby league) (1895–1960), Australian rugby league player
 Tom Peters, title character of the 2004 animated TV series Tom Goes to the Mayor

See also
 Tom Petters (born 1957), CEO of Petters Group Worldwide